RightNOW Women PAC is a volunteer organization and political action committee helping elect Republican women to federal office. They support women candidates from all walks of life who share common beliefs in economic growth, individual responsibility, a strong national defense, access to the best education and quality healthcare at a reasonable cost. RightNOW Women PAC focuses on engaging young professionals in their 20s and 30s to support female candidates through low dollar, high volume fundraising events. RightNOW Women seeks to complement other like-minded organizations by developing a national grassroots movement, connected through social media.

Endorsements in 2014 election

 Shelley Moore Capito
 Nan Hayworth
 Mia Love
 Mimi Walters
 Monica Wehby
 Barbara Comstock
 Joni Ernst
 Martha McSally
 Elise Stefanik

References

External links
 

Republican Party (United States) organizations
United States political action committees